USC Shoah Foundation – The Institute for Visual History and Education, formerly Survivors of the Shoah Visual History Foundation, is a nonprofit organization dedicated to making audio-visual interviews with survivors and witnesses of the Holocaust (which in Hebrew is called the Shoah) and other genocides, a compelling voice for education and action. It was established by Steven Spielberg in 1994, one year after completing his Academy Award-winning film Schindler's List.  In January 2006, the foundation partnered with and relocated to the University of Southern California (USC) and was renamed the USC Shoah Foundation – The Institute for Visual History and Education. In March 2019, the institute opened their new global headquarters on USC's campus.

Visual History Archive 
The foundation's testimonies are preserved in the Visual History Archive. The  archive is digitized, fully searchable via indexed keywords, and hyperlinked. With more than 112,000 hours of testimony... Indexing allows students, teachers, professors, researchers and others around the world to retrieve entire testimonies or search for specific sections within testimonies through a set of nearly 64,000 keywords and phrases, 1.8 million names, and 695,000 images. Each testimony is indexed by a native speaker and each minute of video is timecoded in English. They average a little over two hours each in length and were conducted in 63 countries and 41 languages.

Since its inception, the archive has expanded its collection to include testimony from survivors and witnesses of other genocides, including the genocide against the Tutsi in Rwanda, the Nanjing massacre, Armenian genocide and Guatemalan genocide. Its collections include

 Audio-Visual Testimony: The foundation conducted nearly 52,000 video testimonies between 1994 and 1999, and currently has more than 55,000 .  Most relate to  the Holocaust, including such experiences as Jewish survivors, rescuers and aid-providers, Sinti and Roma survivors, liberators, political prisoners, Jehovah's Witness survivors, war crimes trial participants, eugenic policies survivors, Non-Jewish forced laborers and homosexual survivors, but the Archive expanded in 2013 to include testimonies of Tutsi survivors of the Rwandan genocide and has further expanded   to include interviews with survivors of other genocides, including the Armenian genocide, Cambodian genocide, Guatemalan genocide, Nanjing massacre in Nanjing, China, and the current Rohingya genocide in Myanmar. The vast majority of the testimonies contain a complete personal history of life before, during, and after the interviewee's first-hand experience with genocide.
Testimony in Current Conflict: In an effort to "intervene in the cycle that leads to genocide",foundation conducts testimony interviews in conflict zones with witnesses to pre-genocidal and genocidal violence. Experience groups have included witnesses in South Sudan (2015) and the Central African Republic (2016), Rohingya refugees in Myanmar (2017), and refugees and internally displaced persons in Northern Syria (2019–2020). Interviews are used by researchers, educators, and policy makers around the world.

 Dimensions in Testimony: Dimensions in Testimony is a collection of 22 genocide survivor and witness testimonies, conducted using volumetric capture techniques in order to create 3D interactive video biographies. Included were interviews of, among others, Eva Kor, Edward Mosberg, and Eva Schloss. The resulting experience enables users to engage in real-time conversation with witnesses to historical events. In 2017, The New York Times featured Dimensions in Testimony in a season 6 Op Doc entitled "116 Cameras".
 Testimony on Location: Testimony on Location, the foundation's latest collection,  began in 2019  to interview Holocaust survivors in the physical locations of their pre-war and wartime experiences using 360 capture technology. These allow the viewer to stand virtually  in the location where a survivor's story happened as they hear a survivor's firsthand account of experiences from childhood, ghettos, concentration camps, and liberation.
 Physical Collections: In addition to the audio-visual testimonies, holocaust and genocide studies collection recently acquired by USC's Doheny Library contains more than 1,000 original Nazi books and pamphlets, Jewish publications, microfilms with original documents such as Nazi newspapers and a nearly complete series of original transcripts of the International Nuremberg trials. Also included in the Doheny collection: early Holocaust historiography; early post-war publications of diaries and testimonies in various languages; and original papers of German and Austrian refugees from the Third Reich, including the German-Jewish writer Lion Feuchtwanger.
 Art: Holocaust survivor Edward Mosberg was the subject of a painting by artist David Kassan that appeared in September–December 2019 in an exhibition co-curated by the USC Shoah Foundation and USC’s Fisher Museum of Art, named "Facing Survival."

Research 
The foundation aspires to be the world's academic authority on the study of genocide and personal testimony. It continues to incorporate new collections of genocide eyewitness testimonies while also fostering scholarly activities that confront real-world problems the testimonies address. Scholars in many fields have utilized the resources of the Visual History Archive to teach more than 400 university courses across four continents, including 112 courses at USC. Researchers have utilized the testimonies in more than 121 scholarly works and the archive has been central to dozens of conferences across a range of disciplines.

The Center for Advanced Genocide Research is the research and scholarship unit of the foundation. Founded in 2014, the center engages in interdisciplinary research on the Holocaust and genocide, more specifically the origins of genocide and how to intervene in the cycle that leads to mass violence.
It holds international conferences and workshops and hosts fellows and scholars in residence to conduct research using the resources available at the University of Southern California; it awards up to 10 fellowships every year. Institute fellows, staff and student interns participate in more than a dozen academic events on the USC campus annually. it focusses on interdisciplinary study organized around three themes: "Resistance to Genocide and Mass Violence" focuses on acts of resistance and elements of defiance that slow down or stop genocidal processes. "Violence, Emotion and Behavioral Change" studies the nature of genocide and mass violence and how they impact emotional, social, psychological, historical and physical behavior.

The foundation, in conjunction with its Center for Advanced Genocide Research, held an international conference in November 2014 at USC  "Memory, Media and Technology: Exploring the Trajectories of Schindler's List". In 2015, in collaboration with the Thornton School of Music and USC Visions and Voices, it hosted the international conference  "Singing in the Lion's Mouth: Music as Resistance to Violence", including two days of programming that highlighted the use of music as a tool to resist oppression and spread awareness.

Digital genocide studies 
Digital Genocide Studies examines how big data and large datasets, including the 53,000 testimonies in the foundation's Visual History Archive, can be used to find patterns in the field of mass violence and its resistance. The institute also organizes a yearly series of academic events that brings scholars to USC to present lectures, film screenings and panel discussions. The Visual History Archive is fully viewable at 51 subscribing institutions in 13 countries around the world, mainly universities and museums. The institute also offers a subscription for partial access to the Archive. About 211 institutions in 34 countries have contracted for these smaller collections.

About 1,200 testimonies are  available to any member of the public with an Internet connection who registers to access the Visual History Archive Online.The institute dedicates attention to maintaining each testimony's audio-visual quality, to protect it from degrading over time. With contributions from technology companies, the institute devised a preservation system where the original videos were digitized into a variety of commonly used formats. The digitization of the entire Archive took five years to complete, from 2008 to 2012. During the digitization project, it was discovered that about 5 percent of the 235,005 tapes had audio or visual problems, some to the point of being unwatchable. Finding there were few existing options for restoring tape-based material, the institute's ITS team created new software programs to help them recover both audio and visual problems. The institute has created a digital collections management technology used by clients to preserve their ageing media. Among them are the Academy of Motion Pictures Arts and Sciences and Warner Bros. Pictures. Also under the Access umbrella is the institute's collections unit, which works to expand the Visual History Archive by conducting additional interviews, integrating testimony taken by other institutions, and providing training on the institute's preferred methodology for gathering testimony.

Education 
Using testimony from the  Archive, the foundation develops teaching tools for educators across the disciplinary spectrum, such as social studies, English Language Arts, government, foreign language, world history, American history, and character education. The institute also provides professional development to prepare educators worldwide to use testimony in relevant and engaging ways—providing an experience that takes students beyond the textbook.

IWitness, the institute's flagship educational website, provides students access to 1,600 testimonies for guided exploration. They can engage with the testimonies and bring them into their own multimedia projects via a built-in video editor. Approximately 17,000 high school students and over 5,000 educators in 57 countries and all 50 U.S. states have used the site. It has trained more than 39,000 educators around the world to incorporate testimony into classroom lessons.
More than 200 educators have participated in advanced training and the Teaching with Testimony in the 21st Century programs in the U.S., Ukraine, Czech Republic, Hungary, and Poland.

The foundation's other education programs include:
 Teaching with Testimony in the 21st Century – A two-year professional development program to help educators build their capacity to use testimony and digital learning tools such as IWitness appropriately and effectively in their learning environments.
 ITeach – A one-day seminar that includes an introduction to USC Shoah Foundation's educational programs, the Visual History Archive, methodology, social psychology and pedagogical theory, and the introduction of a testimony-based lesson a teacher has already developed.
 IWalks – An interactive education program that connects the Visual History Archive and other primary sources, to physical locations with memories of historical events that took place on these locations in several European cities. IWalks have been created in Budapest, Hungary; Prague in the Czech Republic; and Warsaw, Poland.
 Teacher Innovation Network – A system created by the  foundation to foster collaboration among teachers around the world who have intersected with the institute's education programs. Membership is automatic based on educators' participation in the institute's professional-development programs or their registration in IWitness. Monthly e-blasts keep members updated on the activities of the institute, and invite dialogue among educators.
 Echoes and Reflections – A Holocaust-focused multimedia professional development program providing secondary teachers in the United States with Holocaust information about European Jews in continental Europe for their classrooms. Developed by the USC Shoah Foundation, Yad Vashem, and the Anti-Defamation League, Echoes and Reflections hold workshops around the country at no cost to teachers or schools. Participants receive a complimentary copy of the 10-part Teacher's Resource Guide.

Global access 
In addition to the  foundation's Visual History Archive and IWitness, the institute's has a YouTube channel, and   Web portals in 12 languages. The complete Visual History Archive is available at 49 institutions around the world, while smaller collections are available at 199 sites in 33 countries. The institute will continue to develop digital technologies to preserve and enhance the Visual History Archive, while building access pathways for students, educators, scholars and the general public. Approximately 1.6 million people view the testimonies every year. The Visual History Archive features more than 1,200 testimonies accessible worldwide.

In 2015, the  foundation added Global Outreach as its fourth organizational pillar. In one year — between 2013–2014 and 2014–15 – the number of people reached by its testimony nearly doubled, from 3.6 million to 6.5 million. The number increases to 15 million when including media exposure, TV broadcasts, museum exhibits, presentations at conferences and workshops, and social media. Global outreach is conducted through   websites, documentaries, and exhibits, as well as national and international press coverage about its programs; and shared media on social platforms.
 On a daily basis, the  foundation posts stories and blogs about projects and people, as well as a new clip of testimony from the Visual History Archive.
 The  foundation has a strong following on Facebook and Twitter, and recently launched an Instagram account.
 In 2014 the  foundation initiated a successful social media campaign called #BeginsWithMe to engage with the millennial generation.
 The foundation and Comcast launched a five-year partnership in 2014 to annually bring programming to millions of customers over the course of seven weeks in the spring commemorating Genocide Awareness Month. Each year, the series is themed with a feature film anchoring the program offerings. The 2015 theme, Music, was anchored by The Pianist and introduced by actor Adrien Brody, who won an Oscar for his role in the film. To expand its reach further, the  foundation seeks to accelerate media production to generate new testimony-based content across multiple channels.
 In 2017 the  foundation initiated a multi-channel campaign called #strongerthanhate in order to provide teachers, parents and community leaders educational tools to help "confront the seeds of hate".

Since 1999 the USC Shoah Foundation annually receives Austrian Holocaust Memorial Service volunteers from the Gedenkdienst program of the Austrian Service Abroad.

Executive Directors  
June Beallor founding Executive Director
James Moll founding Executive Director
Stephen D. Smith current Executive Director

References

External links 
 
 USC Shoah Foundation institute Visual History Archive
 USC Shoah Foundation at Google Cultural institute
 IWitness Education Website

Steven Spielberg
Holocaust commemoration
Institutes of the University of Southern California
Armenian genocide commemoration
The Holocaust and the United States
Holocaust-related organizations
1994 establishments in California
Organizations established in 1994